Haitian coup d'état may refer to:

2004 Haitian coup d'état
1991 Haitian coup d'état
1989 Haitian coup d'état attempt
June 1988 Haitian coup d'état
September 1988 Haitian coup d'état
July 1958 Haitian coup d'état attempt